Kahriz (also Romanized as Kahrīz) is a village in Margha Rural District, in the Central District of Izeh County, Khuzestan Province, Iran. At the 2006 census, its population was 88, in 14 families.

References 

Populated places in Izeh County